"Persuasion" is a song written by Richard Thompson, Peter Filleul and Tim Finn. It was originally composed by Thompson and Filleul as an instrumental for the film Sweet Talker; Capitol Records stablemate Finn added the lyrics and released it in June 1993 as the lead single from his fourth studio album, Before & After. The song reached number 6 on the New Zealand charts, number 62 in Australia and number 76 in Germany.

Thompson admired Finn's lyrics and frequently played the song live himself, with versions appearing on his live albums Celtschmerz (1998) and Live From Austin, TX (2005). A studio version with his son Teddy Thompson was released on Action Packed (2001), the retrospective of Thompson's time with Capitol Records.

Track listing
Australian/New Zealand CD single (8807012)
 "Persuasion" (LP version) - 3:53
 "Six Months in a Leaky Boat" (Live) - 3:15
 "Secret Heart" - 4:30
 "Not Even Close" (Live) - 4:59
 "Protected" (Live) - 6:02

UK  CD single 1 (CDCLS 692)
 "Persuasion" (LP version) - 3:53
 "Parihaka" (featuring Herbs) - 3:20
 "Secret Heart" 5:02
 "Persuasion" (acoustic) (featuring Richard Thompson) - 6:03

UK  CD single 2 (CDCL 692)
 "Persuasion" (LP version) - 3:53
 "Six Months in a Leaky Boat" (Live) - 3:15
 "Not Even Close" (Live) - 4:59
 "Protected" (Live) - 6:02

Charts

References

1993 songs
1993 singles
Songs written by Tim Finn
Songs written by Richard Thompson (musician)
Capitol Records singles